Movements is a 1959 five-movement work for piano and orchestra by Igor Stravinsky lasting about ten minutes. It was written during his serial period and shows his dedication to that idiom as well as the influence of Anton Webern.

Commission 
Stravinsky wrote Movements on a $15,000-commission from a Swiss industrialist for his pianist-wife Margrit Weber, who premiered it at a Stravinsky Festival in New York's Town Hall on January 10, 1960, with the composer conducting. The industrialist had asked for a work of between 15 and 20 minutes in length, but Stravinsky provided a refined and compressed piece lasting barely half as long.

Analysis 
(orchestration: 2 flutes (2nd = piccolo), oboe, English horn, clarinet, bass clarinet, bassoon, 2 trumpets, 3 trombones, harp, celesta, strings and solo piano)

Stravinsky breaks the orchestra down into chamber-sized sections with the piano acting as a pivot between these, creating the type of subtle and gestural textures favored by Webern in his Concerto for Nine Instruments (Op. 24) and Variations for Orchestra (Op. 30), the latter a work much admired by Stravinsky.

The highly constructed nature of the twelve-tone idiom he uses draws all its thematic material from one tone-row, which the piano gives in one non-linear gesture right at the opening: E F B A A D C B C F G and F. 

As it turns out, this tone-row will be presented complete only a couple of times. Mostly it is broken into small bits and served in slightly varied orderings. The technique of Klangfarbenmelodie can thus clearly be heard, particularly in the opening of the piece, whose gestural phrase mimics that of Webern's Op. 24.

Stravinsky himself described the harmonic structure of Movements as "anti-tonal". Traditional references to triadic harmonic structures are banished in favor of a near-total line-based idiom, and conventional ostinati and harmonic considerations are replaced by an atonal contrapuntal texture characterized by gestures, inner unity, and adherence to serial forms more pervasive than before in Stravinsky's career.

References

Further reading 
 Babbitt, Milton. 1986. "Order, Symmetry, and Centricity in Late Stravinsky". In Confronting Stravinsky: Man, Musician, and Modernist, edited by Jann Pasler, 247–61. Berkeley, Los Angeles and London: University of California Press. .
 Babbitt, Milton. 1987. "Stravinsky's Verticals and Schoenberg's Diagonals: A Twist of Fate". In Stravinsky Retrospectives, edited by Ethan Haimo and Paul Johnson, 15–35. Lincoln and London: University of Nebraska Press. .
 Cone, Edward T. 1962. "The Uses of Convention: Stravinsky and His Models". The Musical Quarterly 48, no. 3, Special Issue for Igor Stravinsky on His 80th Anniversary (July): 287–99.
 Keller, Hans. 1961. No Bridge to Nowhere: An Introduction to Stravinsky's Movements and Schoenberg's Violin Concerto . The Musical Times 102, no. 1417 (March): 156–58.
 Locanto, Massimiliano. 2009. "'Composing with Intervals': Intervallic Syntax and Serial Technique in Late Stravinsky", translated by Chadwick Jenkins. Music Analysis 28, nos. 2–3 (July–October): 221–66.
 Straus, Joseph N. 2001. Stravinsky's Late Music. Cambridge Studies in Music and Analysis. Cambridge and New York: Cambridge University Press. .
 White, Eric Walter. 1979. Stravinsky: The Composer and His Works, second edition. Berkeley and Los Angeles: The University of California Press. .

Compositions by Igor Stravinsky